Fairfield Heights is a suburb of Sydney, in the state of New South Wales, Australia. Fairfield Heights is located 25 kilometres west of the Sydney central business district in the local government area of the City of Fairfield. Fairfield Heights is part of the Greater Western Sydney region.

Fairfield Heights shares the postcode of 2165 with the separate suburbs of Fairfield, Fairfield East and Fairfield West. The majority of residents speak a language other than English at home, with the most common one being Assyrian Neo-Aramaic. Fairfield Heights, like Fairfield, is also an ethnic enclave of Assyrians. There are also high levels of Iraqi, Chinese and Vietnamese ancestry.

It has the colloquial nickname in the area of "The Heights".

History
Aboriginal people from the Cabrogal tribe, a sub-group of the Gandangara tribe, have lived in the Fairfield area for over 30,000 years. White settlement came to the area in the early 19th century. An application for a post office at Fairfield Heights was made by Mrs Beard in 1950. In 1955, when the population had increased sufficiently a post office was opened.

Fairfield Heights mostly consists of low and medium density residential housing and commercial development. The commercial area is centred on The Boulevarde, the main street in Fairfield Heights, which is the highest point in the suburb at 40 metres above sea level, offering striking views of the lower areas to the south and east. The peak of elevation is on the intersection of The Boulevarde and Polding Street. Polding Street is a long straight road that connects from The Horsley Drive in Fairfield to the Cumberland Highway in Smithfield and on through Prairiewood, Wetherill Park before ending in Bossley Park.

Culture and services
The Boulevarde features numerous restaurants, services and food stores. These include a variety of chicken and kebab shops, bakeries, Chinese and Vietnamese restaurants, cafes, butcher shops, Pizza Hut and Domino's Pizza, an Australia Post location, real estate agents, automotive mechanical workshops, several medical centres, pharmacies and radiology services. Other businesses include dollar stores, health clinics, hookah lounges, cosmetic clinics, and a Vinnies store. Despite its small size, business hours in Fairfield Heights are extended further than those in Fairfield.

Assyrian Sports and Cultural Club is the prominent club in the suburb. The club was originally opened in 1990, in The Boulevarde, where it held liquor and gaming licenses. In 1997 the Club bought the premises at 52–54 Stanbrook Street. The project of turning the gymnasium, squash courts and fruit shop into a club began in January 2000. The new club site was opened by former Mayor Anwar Khoshaba in a ceremony that was visited by politicians, Councillors and many Assyrians. In 2003, the reception hall was built and the club grounds were expanded to fit weddings and other social events.

Hammurabi Restaurant is located on Cultural Club's old premises in The Boulevarde. It is an ethnic restaurant, serving Assyrian cuisine and Iraqi cuisine, and it features a reception hall  for Assyrians.

Two of the longest-term commercial residents of Fairfield Heights are Uncle Bill's Barber Shop and the Brown Jug Hotel. Uncle Bill's barber shop was established in 1963 and stayed open until COVID shut down all businesses in the area, with service resuming in 2022 under a new barber with a new interior and a new name. The Brown Jug Hotel was built in the late 1960s as the Town Inn, by Ronald Leslie Tooby, a Bathurst born veteran of World War II. After being sold multiple times it acquired the current name on the 9th of August 1971. ABC Bicycles was another long-term commercial resident until its closure in 2015. The Commonwealth Bank had a branch there for over 50 years until it was closed in 2019 as a cost-cutting measure.

A dilapidated Food For Less store was demolished in 2011 and developed into a new Woolworths store, a pharmacy and restaurant location which was first occupied by a fish and chip shop then replaced by Al Basha, a Middle Eastern chicken and shawarma restaurant in 2015.

One series of the television show Fat Pizza was filmed at a restaurant location in the commercial area. Housos, another television show from the makers of Fat Pizza was filmed on location at the northern end of The Boulevarde where it becomes a cul-de-sac.

Recreational and sports
Prospect View Park is a floodlit sports ground that is home to the historic Smithfield Hotspurs Football Club, which is now Fairfield Hotspurs following a 1999 merger between Smithfield and the Fairfield Heights club. This was the junior club of Australian national team players Harry Kewell and Keanu Baccus. In summer the ground is used as a grade cricket field while in winter two full-size and one junior football fields are used. Fairfield Heights Park is a park that contains natural bushland, children's playgrounds and footpaths for walking or jogging. Although not situated in the suburb, Brenan Park is a very large park with multiple cricket, football and tennis courts that borders the western outskirts of Fairfield Heights.

Education
There is one local primary school, Fairfield Heights Public School, established in 1952. Some residents may attend the Fairvale, Fairfield, Fairfield West, Smithfield Public Schools or the private St Gertrude's Catholic Primary School. There are no high schools within the Fairfield Heights locality. High School students will, depending on their exact location in the suburb and family history, attend Fairfield High School, Fairvale High School or Westfields Sports High School which despite being a speciality Sports school, may be available to a limited number of Fairfield Heights local residents. Fairfield library and the community library at Smithfield, a suburb two kilometres to the northwest, are the nearest libraries for residents of Fairfield Heights. These educational facilities are used as polling locations for Local Council, State and Federal Elections.

Places of worship
Holy Apostolic Catholic (Universal) Assyrian Church of East St Mary’s Church, Holy Apostolic Catholic (Universal) Chaldeans and Assyrians St Mary’s Assumption Church, St Therese's Catholic Church and Nguyen Thieu Vietnamese Buddhist temple are located in this suburb.

Demographics
At the 2021 census, there were 8,269 residents in Fairfield Heights. 29.5% of people were born in Australia. The most common other countries of birth were Iraq 28.4%, Vietnam 8.8%, Syria 8.4%, Cambodia 2.9%, and China 2.9%. The top languages were Assyrian Neo-Aramaic 19.9%, Arabic 14.4%, Vietnamese 11.5%, Chaldean Neo-Aramaic 9.6% and Khmer 2.7%. Combining the varieties of Assyrian and Chaldean, Neo-Aramaic will be the most common language at 29.5%.

The most common ancestries were Assyrian 19.7%, Iraqi 12.2%, Vietnamese 11.0%, Chaldean 9.1%, and Chinese 8.8%.

The most common responses for religion were Catholic 35.2%, Assyrian Church of the East 12.6%, Buddhism 11.2%, No Religion 9.2%, and Christian (not further defined) 6.8%. Christianity was the largest religious group reported overall (69.1%).

Notable residents
Fairfield Heights was once the home of tennis player Jelena Dokić and her family.

References

Suburbs of Sydney
City of Fairfield